Events in the year 1990 in Trinidad and Tobago.

Incumbents
 President: Noor Hassanali
 Prime Minister: A. N. R. Robinson
 Chief Justice: Clinton Bernard

Events
 27 July – 1 August – Jamaat al Muslimeen coup attempt

Deaths
 1 August – Leo Des Vignes, Member of Parliament for Diego Martin Central.

References

 
1990s in Trinidad and Tobago
Years of the 20th century in Trinidad and Tobago
Trinidad and Tobago
Trinidad and Tobago
Trinidad and Tobago